Stolen Moments may refer to:

Stolen Moments (film), a 1920 film starring Rudolph Valentino
"Stolen Moments" (Oliver Nelson song), a 1960 jazz standard by Oliver Nelson
"Stolen Moments" (Jim Witter song), a 1993 song by Jim Witter
Stolen Moments (Oliver Nelson album), 1975
Stolen Moments (Jimmy Raney and Doug Raney album), 1979
Stolen Moments (John Hiatt album), 1990
Stolen Moments (Lee Ritenour album), 1990
Stolen Moments (Alison Brown album), 2005
Stolen Moments (Prudence Liew album)
"Stolen Moments", a song by Alicia Keys from her 2005 live album, Unplugged